The 1950 South Dakota gubernatorial election was held on November 7, 1950. Incumbent Republican Governor George T. Mickelson was unable to seek re-election to a third term due to newly imposed term limits. Accordingly, a competitive race to replace him ensued. Attorney General Sigurd Anderson won a slim plurality in the Republican primary, barely exceeding 35% and narrowly avoiding having the Republican nomination sent to the state party convention. In the general election, Anderson faced State Representative Joe Robbie. Anderson easily defeated Robbie, winning his first term with 61% of the vote to Robbie's 39%.

Democratic primary
State Representative Joe Robbie, who represented Davison County in the State House, was the only Democrat to file for the gubernatorial race, winning the nomination by default and removing the race from the primary election ballot.

Republican primary

Candidates
Sigurd Anderson, Attorney General of South Dakota
Joe Foss, World War II flying ace
Boyd Leedom, attorney
Charles J. Dalthorp, State Finance Director
Irwin R. Erickson, former Assistant Attorney General of South Dakota

Results

General election

Results

References

Bibliography
 

1950
South Dakota
Gubernatorial
November 1950 events in the United States